Eubranchus fuegiensis is a species of sea slug or nudibranch, a marine gastropod mollusc in the family Eubranchidae.

Distribution
This species was described from Tierra del Fuego, Chile. It has been reported from Punta Rico, Beagle Channel.

References

Eubranchidae
Gastropods described in 1926
Endemic fauna of Chile